Tijjani Reijnders (born 29 July 1998) is a Dutch professional footballer who plays as a midfielder for AZ Alkmaar.

Personal life
Reijnders is the son of Martin Reynders, and the brother of Eliano Reijnders who are also professional footballers. Reijnders is of Indonesian descent through his mother. He was born in Zwolle on 29 July 1998.

Club Careers 
Tijjani Reijnders' role in the football scene started at a young age, where he started his career with the FC Twente youth team. It's just that he played at FC Twente until the U-17 team before being released to CSV '28 and playing for one year from 2015 to 2016.

In 2016, Tijjani Reijnders joined his homeland team PEC Zwolle U-19 where he then moved up the level and appeared in the Eredivisie club's first team. Even at PEC Zwolle Reijnders only played one year. In 2017, he crossed over to AZ Alkmaar's Under-21 team and moved up to the first team in 2018.

In 2020, he was loaned to RKC Waalwijk for six months, from January to June. After that the son of former FC Zwolle striker, Martin Reijnders, returned to AZ Alkmaar and played in the first team.

References

External links
 
 Tijjani Reijnders Profile at Swarakyat Jakarta, according to Swarakyat.id

1998 births
Living people
Dutch people of Indonesian descent
Sportspeople from Zwolle
Dutch footballers
Footballers from Overijssel
Association football midfielders
Netherlands youth international footballers
Eredivisie players
Eerste Divisie players
AZ Alkmaar players
Jong AZ players
RKC Waalwijk players
PEC Zwolle players